When Strangers Marry (rerelease title Betrayed) is a 1944 American suspense film directed by William Castle and starring Dean Jagger, Kim Hunter and Robert Mitchum.

Plot
Millie Baxter, a naïve woman, comes to New York City to meet her salesman husband Paul Baxter, whom she had met only months before, and discovers that he may be a murderer.

Cast
 Dean Jagger as Paul Baxter
 Kim Hunter as Millie Baxter
 Robert Mitchum as Fred Graham (billed as Bob Mitchum)
 Neil Hamilton as Det. Lt. Blake
 Rhonda Fleming as Girl on Train

Production
The film was originally known as Love from a Stranger and then I Married a Stranger.

Producers Frank and Maurice King liked The Whistler, a film that director William Castle had made, and borrowed him from Columbia Pictures for $500 a week. Castle later said that the script originally offered to him was "horrible", the story of a gangster who is killed, rejected from heaven and returned to earth. Castle had previously directed Chance of a Lifetime from a script that he disliked and did not wish to repeat the experience. He advised the King brothers that they should not make the film, and they agreed. The brothers introduced Castle to writer Philip Yordan, with whom he devised a new story idea that the Kings liked. Yordan gave the story to aspiring novelist Dennis Cooper, but Yordan later rewrote Cooper's work. Cooper and Yordan were given joint screenwriting credit in the film.

With only seven days and a budget of $50,000, filming took place in June 1944. Neil Hamilton and Kim Hunter were borrowed from Selznick International. Castle persuaded the leads to rehearse without pay and on their own time.

When Strangers Marry marked Rhonda Fleming's film debut in a small role. Fleming later claimed that she had been cast when Castle saw her walking through the backlot and said "you'll do." She also said that she was not paid for her role.

Robert Mitchum's role is among his earliest, and he had previously appeared in Johnny Doesn't Live Here Anymore for the King brothers. The Kings later claimed that they had Mitchum under a multi-picture contract and tried to enforce it, but he made no further films for them.

Castle was slated to next direct Dillinger for the King brothers but instead accepted an offer to direct the Broadway play Meet a Body.

Reception

Critical response
Variety's review was positive: "Only thing wrong with this film is its misleading title. Tag, When Strangers Marry, suggests another of the problem plays of newlyweds when in reality pic is a taught (sic) psychological thriller about a murderer and a manhunt full of suspense and excitement."

In a contemporary review of the film, Orson Welles wrote: "It isn't as slick as Double Indemnity or as glossy as Laura, but it's better acted and better directed ... than either." Welles would later work with Castle on The Lady from Shanghai.

James Agee later wrote: "The story has locomotor ataxia at several of its joints and the intensity of the telling slackens off toward the end; but taking it as a whole, I have seldom, for years now, seen one hour so energetically and sensibly used in a film".

Adaptation
The film was adapted for an episode of Lux Video Theatre as "I Married a Stranger."

References

Note

External links
 
 
 
 
Review at Variety
Complete film at Internet Archive

1944 films
1940s psychological thriller films
American black-and-white films
Film noir
Films scored by Dimitri Tiomkin
Films directed by William Castle
Monogram Pictures films
American psychological thriller films
1940s English-language films
1940s American films